Axel Müller Aranda (born 25 November 1993) is an Argentine rugby union player.

Muller has signed with the French rugby club Toulon to play in the Top 14. He represented Argentina's under-20 team at the 2013 IRB Junior World Championship. He was selected to play for Argentina at the 2016 Summer Olympics.

He is a former decathlete and played American football as a youngster. At the age of 9 his father got a job in the United States so he moved with his family and lived in Ahwatukee in Phoenix, Arizona. They moved back to Argentina when he was 17.

References

External links 
 
 
 
 

1993 births
Living people
Argentine rugby union players
RC Toulonnais players
Argentina international rugby union players
Male rugby sevens players
Argentina international rugby sevens players
Rugby sevens players at the 2016 Summer Olympics
Olympic rugby sevens players of Argentina
Place of birth missing (living people)
Argentine expatriate sportspeople in France
World Games silver medalists
Competitors at the 2013 World Games
Pan American Games silver medalists for Argentina
Rugby sevens players at the 2015 Pan American Games
Medalists at the 2015 Pan American Games
Pan American Games medalists in rugby sevens